Beykoz University is a private non-profit foundation university in İstanbul, Turkey. It was established on 20 August 2016 with other 3 new universities.

Beykoz University was founded as the successor of Beykoz Vocational School of Logistics (Beykoz Lojistik Meslek Yüksekokulu) by TÜRLEV.

References

Universities and colleges in Istanbul
Private universities and colleges in Turkey
Educational institutions established in 2016
2016 establishments in Turkey